Brigham Young is a marble statue by Mahonri Young representing the Mormon religious leader of the same name, installed in the United States Capitol, in Washington D.C., as part of the National Statuary Hall Collection. It is one of two statues donated by the state of Utah, and is unusual in the collection in that Young is portrayed sitting down.  The statue was unveiled by Alben William Barkley on June 1, 1950.

History
The commission for the Brigham Young statue was highly sought after, particularly by Young and Avard Fairbanks.  The final choice of the sculptor was left to the three surviving daughters of Brigham Young. Young had sculpted Brigham Young before, including him in the central group of the This is the Place Monument unveiled in Salt Lake City in 1947, which the family approved of. They did not like Cyrus Dallin's portrayal of Young.  The statue was unveiled in Washington by Mable Young Sandborn, then Brigham Young's last surviving child.

References

External links
 

1950 establishments in Washington, D.C.
1950 sculptures
Cultural depictions of Brigham Young
Marble sculptures in Washington, D.C.
Monuments and memorials in Washington, D.C.
Young, Brigham
Sculptures of men in Washington, D.C.
Statues of presidents
Statues of religious leaders